Imperio was an Austrian Eurodance/dream trance group formed in 1994 by producer Norbert Reichart.

Musical career
They released their first album "Veni Vidi Vici" in 1995 which was performed by Manuela Ray (singer) and Michael Harris (rapper). Four singles were released from this album. They released their second album "Return To Paradise" in 1996 which was performed by M.Ray & Lawrence Madia.

Discography

Studio albums

Singles

References

External links
 Danceartistinfo.com
 Eurokdj.com
 Discography

Austrian Eurodance groups
Austrian trance music groups
English-language singers from Austria